Te Ūpokorehe is a Māori tribal group located in the eastern Bay of Plenty region of New Zealand. There is currently a dispute over whether it is a hapū (sub-tribe) of Whakatōhea or an iwi (tribe) in its own right.

The rohe (tribal area) of Te Ūpokorehe extends form Maraetotara (Ohope) in the west to the middle of Waioeka River (Ōpōtiki) in the east, within the boundaries of Ōpōtiki District and Whakatāne District.

History

Te Ūpokorehe was included as a hapū within Whakatōhea when the Whakatōhea Maori Trust Board was established in 1952. Hapū members were considered part of Whakatōhea, an iwi tracing its heritage back to ancestors arriving on the waka (migration canoes) Te Arautauta, Nukutere and Mātaatua.

A schism emerged over time between members of the tribe who considered themselves part of Whakatōhea and those who did not. As of July 2022, more than 700 people have signed a petition seeking to remove Te Ūpokorehe from the Whakatōhea Treaty of Waitangi settlement, including whānau at Roimata Marae, claiming it would leave the tribe worse off. However, more than 1700 Ūpokorehe people remained registered with Te Whakatōhea Maori Trust Board. Some told media they disagreed with the petition and wanted to remain part of the Whakatōhea settlement.

Marae

Te Ūpokorehe includes the following marae groupings:

Governance

The Whakatōhea Māori Trust Board was established in 1952 to administer the assets of Whakatōhea, and provides members with education, health services and training in various commercial fields. It is a charitable trust governed by two representatives from each of the six hapū, and based in Ōpōtiki. It is also accountable to the Minister of Maori Affairs and is governed by the Maori Trust Boards Act. The trust represents the tribe's fisheries interest under the Māori Fisheries Act 2004, and its aquaculture interests under the Māori Commercial Aquaculture Claims Settlement Act 2004. It represents the tribe during consultation on resource consent applications under the Resource Management Act 1991.

The Whakatōhea Pre-Settlement Claims Trust represents Whakatōhea during Treaty of Waitangi settlement negotiations. The New Zealand Government recognised the trust's mandate to represent Whakatōhea, including Te Ūpokorehe, with an Agreement in Principle signed with the Crown on 18 August 2017. The trust is governed by one trustee elected from each of six hapū, one trustee appointed from each of eight marae, and an additional trustee appointed by Whakatōhea Māori Trust Board. The trust is administered by the same staff as the trust board, in the same offices in Ōpōtiki.

Whānau of Roimata Marae say they aren't represented on the trusts and the trusts cannot act on their behalf.

The tribal area of Te Ūpokorehe is located within the boundaries of Ōpōtiki District Council, Whakatāne District Council and Bay of Plenty Regional Council.

Media

Pan-tribal iwi station Sea 92FM broadcasts to members of Te Ūpokorehe and Whakatōhea, as well as Ngāitai and Te Whānau-ā-Apanui, in the Ōpōtiki area. It operates the low-power Opotiki 88.1 FM, geared towards a young demographic.

See also
 List of Māori iwi

References

 
Iwi and hapū